Koottukudumbam is a 1969 Indian Malayalam-language film directed by K. S. Sethumadhavan. The film stars Prem Nazir, Sathyan, Sheela and Sharada. It was released on 28 November 1969.

Plot

Cast 

Prem Nazir as Radhakrishna Kurup
Sathyan as Appukkuttan
Sheela as Thankamma
Sharada as Shyamala
KPAC Lalitha as Saraswathi
Adoor Bhasi as Kollam Raghavan
Manavalan Joseph as Soman
Adoor Bhavani as Karthyayinippilla
Adoor Pankajam as Saraswathi's Sister-in-law
Alummoodan as Unnithan
Kottarakkara Sreedharan Nair as Ilanjikkal Rama Kurup
N. Govindankutty as Velayudhan Pillai
S. J. Dev
S. P. Pillai as Thankamma's Father
Ushakumari as Radhika
KPAC Khan as Govindan Nair

Soundtrack 
The music was composed by G. Devarajan and the lyrics were written by Vayalar Ramavarma.

References

External links 
 

1960s Malayalam-language films
1969 films
Films directed by K. S. Sethumadhavan